WHHY-FM (101.9 MHz, "Y102") is a radio station licensed to serve Montgomery, Alabama, United States.  The station is owned by Cumulus Media.

Y102 broadcasts a Top 40 (CHR) music format. The WHHY-FM studios are located on the 3rd floor of The Colonial Financial Center in downtown Montgomery. The broadcast signal, based from a transmitter in Montgomery's northeast side, can be heard as far away as Birmingham, Alabama, and is generally clear south of there along Interstate 65.

History
The station first operated in downtown Montgomery. During the late 1960s the station moved from the Frank Leu Building downtown, into a house on Norman Bridge Road. A broadcast wing was added to the back of the building in the early 1970s. The original "WHHY" was an AM station (1440 AM) owned by Holt/Robinson. The FM station on 101.9 was an automated FM country music station before becoming a rock station.  It would be known as "The Music FM - Y-102". The FM station would simulcast the AM's morning show (06:00-10:00) hosted by longtime personality and program director Larry Stevens. This was followed on AM by Kris O'Kelly (10:00-14:00), "The Thin Man" (14:00-18:00), music director Lanny West (18:00-22:00) Jeffry Tilden (22:00-02:00) and public relations director Mike Sanders (02:00-06:00). During the 1970s Y-102 would split from the AM at 10 am each morning and would broadcast light classic rock (Elton John, ELO, Billy Joel, Bob Seger, etc.) The AM was CHR.

In the early 1980s, the FM became the focus station of the pair. The FM was changed to CHR. The AM format was changed to adult contemporary. During the 1990s Holt/Robinson broadcasting began to have money problems. Longtime morning show host Larry Stevens exited to rival Colonial Broadcasting. The format was shifted to "New Rock" and known as "Live 101.9". In May 1993, Holt-Robinson Communications Corporation was placed into receivership. Thomas M. Duddy was approved by the FCC as receiver on June 21, 1993. In May 1995, receiver Thomas M. Duddy made a deal to sell this station to McDonald Investment Company, Inc.  The deal was approved by the FCC on July 3, 1995, and the transaction was consummated on September 15, 1995. McDonald in turn sold it to Cumulus Broadcasting. The FM station's format was changed to country music by McDonald then back to CHR by Cumulus. The AM had several formats, including late 1970s AC with Larry King overnights and oldies. Cumulus Broadcasting changed the format of the AM to talk ("News Radio 1440") and ended the heritage call letters WHHY.

The station was reassigned the heritage WHHY-FM call letters by the Federal Communications Commission on January 22, 1999.

References

External links
WHHY-FM official website
Connect with Y102:

Facebook https://www.facebook.com/AllTheHitsY102/

Twitter https://twitter.com/y102_montgomery

HHY-FM
Contemporary hit radio stations in the United States
Cumulus Media radio stations
Radio stations established in 1962
1962 establishments in Alabama